Annika Wendle (born 15 September 1997) is a German freestyle wrestler. She is a two-time bronze medalist at the European Wrestling Championships.

Career 

She won the silver medal in the women's 53 kg event at the 2018 World University Wrestling Championships held in Goiânia, Brazil.

In 2019, she competed in the 53 kg event at the European Wrestling Championships held in Bucharest, Romania where she was eliminated in her first match by Jessica Blaszka of the Netherlands. Blaszka went on to win one of the bronze medals in that event. In that same year, she also competed in the 55 kg event at the 2019 World Wrestling Championships held in Nur-Sultan, Kazakhstan without winning a medal.

In 2020, she won one of the bronze medals in the 53 kg event at the European Wrestling Championships held in Rome, Italy. In the same year, she also won the silver medal in the women's 55 kg event at the 2020 Individual Wrestling World Cup held in Belgrade, Serbia. In the final, she lost against Iryna Kurachkina of Belarus. In April 2021, she won one of the bronze medals in the 53 kg event at the European Wrestling Championships held in Warsaw, Poland. In May 2021, she failed to qualify for the Olympics at the World Olympic Qualification Tournament held in Sofia, Bulgaria. In October 2021, she was eliminated in her first match in the women's 53 kg event at the 2021 World Wrestling Championships held in Oslo, Norway.

She competed in the women's 53 kg event at the 2022 European Wrestling Championships held in Budapest, Hungary where she was eliminated in her first match. She won one of the bronze medals in the women's 53kg event at the Grand Prix de France Henri Deglane 2023 held in Nice, France.

Achievements

References

External links 
 

Living people
1997 births
Place of birth missing (living people)
German female sport wrestlers
European Wrestling Championships medalists
21st-century German women